Barton County is the name of two counties in the United States:

Barton County, Kansas 
Barton County, Missouri